Elaine Mary H. McLaughlin (born 17 November 1963) is a Northern Irish former hurdler. She competed for Great Britain and Northern Ireland in the women's 400 metres hurdles at the 1988 Seoul Olympics. She was also a two-time Commonwealth Games finalist for Northern Ireland (1986, 1990) and won the UK Championships 400m hurdles title three times (1987–89).

Career
McLaughlin finished seventh for Northern Ireland in the 400 metres hurdles final at the 1986 Commonwealth Games, won the 1987 UK Championships and finished second at the 1987 WAAA Championships.

McLaughlin's best season came in 1988. With a pre-season best of 57.48 secs in 1987, she ran 56.22 to win the second of her three UK Championship titles in June 1988, improved her best to 56.09 in August 1988, when finishing second to Sally Gunnell at the AAA Championships/Olympic trials, earning Olympic selection, and ended the season achieving a lifetime best of 55.91 in the semifinals at the 1988 Seoul Olympics in September. This performance ranked her second on the UK all-time list at that time, and still (as of 2018) ranks her 12th on the UK all-time list and remains the Northern Irish record.

McLaughlin won her third consecutive UK Championships title in 1989 and went on to finish fifth in the 1990 Commonwealth Games final in January 1990.

International competitions

National titles
UK Championships (1987, 1988, 1989)

References

1963 births
Living people
Athletes (track and field) at the 1988 Summer Olympics
British female hurdlers
Olympic athletes of Great Britain
Place of birth missing (living people)
Athletes (track and field) at the 1986 Commonwealth Games
Athletes (track and field) at the 1990 Commonwealth Games
Commonwealth Games competitors for Northern Ireland